The family name Mestmaker belonged to a Russian baronial family.

History 
The name can be traced back to Ivan Ivanovich Mestmaker (German Johann von Mestmacher; 1732-1805), who was the resident minister under the Prince-bishop of Lübeck, later envoy to Dresden. He was elevated to baronial level in 1777.

The name is included in the noble Matricula of the Courland Governorate and in the V part of the pedigree book of the Podolian Governorate.

The State Council approved Baron Pavel Mestmaker's, nephew Viktor Viktorovich Buddha (1881-1914)  allowed to add to his surname - the surname and title of his adoptive parent, Baron Mestmaker and be called Baron Mestmaker-Buddha, with the right to use the family coat of arms.

Coat of Arms 

The shield has a blue field and depicts an elevated golden rafter. On either side and in the middle are three black doves.

The shield is crowned with a baronial crown. The basting on the shield is blue, enclosed in gold.

Lineage 

 Ivan Ivanovich Mestmaker 1st Baron Mestmaker (born 17.08.1733, Revel, d.10.12.1805, St. Petersburg). Wife : Wilhelmina-Juliana-Sophia, nee. Baroness Wedel-Jarlsberg (b. 05/31/1752, Copenhagen, d. 02/22/1789)
 Baron Fyodor Ivanovich Mestmaker (born 05/12/1774, d. 05/08/1817). Wife : Louise-Rosina, nee background. Zeiten (Louise Rosine von Zeiten; b. 12/28/1789, d. 02/05/1834, St. Petersburg).
 Baron Pavel Fedorovich Mestmaker (born 05.08.1807, d.?). Wife : Elizabeth (or Olga) Pavlovna Divova, daughter of Pavel Gavrilovich Divov (born 01/18/1765, d. 09/19/1841) and Elena Stepanovna, nee. Strekalova (born 02.01.1786, d.21.02.1868).
 Baron Pavel Pavlovich Mestmaker
 Baroness Elena Pavlovna Mestmaker
 Baroness Olga Pavlovna Mestmaker (d. After 11/25/1856)
 Baroness Alexandra Pavlovna Mestmaker (born 11/10/1850, d. 06/12/1909). Husband: Victor Emmanuilovich Buddha (born 03/01/1836, d. 02/02/1903 (07/02/1901?)).
 Alexandra Viktorovna Buddha (b. 09/18/1879, d. 1919). Husband: Mikhail Oskarovich Paton (born 05.08.1865, Nice, France, d. 1919), son of Oscar-Johann-Yakov Petrovitch Paton (born 08.11.1823) and Ekaterina Dmitrievna, nee. Shishkova (born about 1834).
 Victor Viktorovich Buddha, 1st Baron Mestmaker-Buddha (born 15.04.1881, d.19.07.1914, Kharkov). Wife : Lyudmila Alekseevna, nee Dmitrieva (b. 07/30/1884, d. 11/08/1953, Brussels, Belgium).
 Baron Viktor Viktorovich Mestmaker-Buddha (born 03.06.1906, St. Petersburg, d.20.03.1987, Emburg, Belgium). Wife : Svetlana Kornelievna, nee. N.
 Baroness Ludmila Viktorovna Mestmaker-Buddha.
 Olga Viktorovna Buddha
 Natalia Viktorovna Buddha (born 25.10.1884, died 1971). Husband : Evgeny Paton (born 03/04/1870, died 08/12/1953), brother of M.O. Paton.
 Baron Nikolai Fedorovich Mestmaker.
 Baroness Wilhelmina Fedorovna Mestmaker (born 06/15/1812, d. 07/13/1852). Husband : Sergei Andreevich Faminitsyn (born 18.10.1803, d. 14.03.1879), son of Andrei Egorovich Famitsyn and Praskovya Ivanovna, nee. Romanchukova
 Baroness Luiza Fedorovna Mestmaker (b. 1816, d. 11/28/1874, St. Petersburg).
 Baron Peter-Friedrich-Ludwig Mestmaker (Peter Friedrich Ludwig; born 03/10/1779, Entin, died 05/05/1815, St. Petersburg).
 Baroness NN Ivanovna Mestmaker. Husband : Prince Alexander Yakovlevich Khilkov (born 04.04.1755, died 04.1819), son of Prince Yakov Vasilyevich Khilkov and Elizaveta Nikitichna, nee. Zotova

References 

Russian noble families